Gerardo Gonzalez (also spelled Geraldo) was a farmer that owned a large amount of land in the southwest region of Puerto Rico, close to where today is the town of Hormigueros, which he founded in 1874.

References

Puerto Rican farmers
Puerto Rican legends